Annfinnur í Skála (born 20 September 1941 in Tórshavn, Faroe Islands) is a Faroese writer. He holds an MA in history and English and has taught at the Faroese upper secondary school since 1975.

Bibliography

History and society schoolbooks 
 Stjórnarskipanarmálið 1946. Keldur til Føroya søgu. (Danish: Færøernes forfatningsmæssige stilling i 1946. Kilder til Færøernes historie). Føroya Skúlabókagrunnur. Tórshavn 1994
 Frá stórkríggi til heimskríggj 1918-1939 (From grand war to world war 1918-1939). Føroya Skúlabókagrunnur. Tórshavn 1994
 Søga Týsklands 1918-1939 (History of Germany 1918-1939). Føroya Skúlabókagrunnur, Tórshavn 1994

Dictionaries 
 Ensk-føroysk orðabók (English-Faroese dictionary). (Co-authors: Jonhard Mikkelsen and Zakarias Wang). Stiðin, Tórshavn 1992
 Donsk-føroysk orðabók (Danish-Faroese dictionary). (Co-authors: Jonhard Mikkelsen, Hanna Jacobsen and Zakarias Wang). Stiðin. Tórshavn 1998
 Føroysk-ensk orðabók (Faroese-English dictionary). (Co-author: Jonhard Mikkelsen. Sprotin). Tórshavn 2008
 Ensk-føroysk orðabók (English-Faroese dictionary from 1992, revideret og udvidet). (Co-author: Jonhard Mikkelsen). Sprotin. Tórshavn 2008

Fiction 
 Heimurin forni 1. Hjá dvørgum í Niðafjøllum. Sprotin. Tórshavn 2000
 Heimurin forni 2. Ferðin til Zambora. Sprotin. Tórshavn 2000

Crime and Science fiction 
Vitjan…, (Visit) Sprotin, 2011

Awards 
 2001 - Faroese Literature Prize (Mentanarvirðisløn M. A. Jacobsens)

References 

1941 births
People from Tórshavn
Faroese male novelists
Faroese writers
Faroese fantasy writers
Faroese Literature Prize recipients
Living people